Several air force stations and other establishments, many of them training facilities, operated in Calgary, Alberta, Canada from the mid-1930s to the mid-1960s.

RCAF Station Lincoln Park
In 1935 the RCAF constructed a landing field on a section of the Canadian Army's Currie Barracks located in southwest Calgary. The airfield was known as Currie Field or the Calgary Military Airport. In 1938, the aerodrome was home to two RCAF squadrons: No. 3 (Bomber) Squadron with the Westland Wapiti and No. 1 (Fighter) Squadron with the Armstrong Whitworth Siskin and later, the Hawker Hurricane. No. 1 (F) Squadron was renumbered to 401 Squadron when it was posted overseas for combat duty. During the Second World War, the British Commonwealth Air Training Plan (BCATP) established No. 3 Service Flying Training School (SFTS) at the airfield. Aircraft flown at this school were Avro Ansons and Cessna Cranes. No. 3 SFTS closed on September 28, 1945.

After the war, No. 10 Repair Depot was located at the station until 1947 when No. 25 Air Materiel Base Calgary was formed. The base was renamed RCAF Station Lincoln Park. Among the station's functions, Lincoln Park was a training centre for NATO pilots. This training facility closed in 1958 and the station became an emergency landing field. RCAF Station Lincoln Park was closed in 1964, but portions of the base were retained to house military families. The former hangar line at Lincoln Park was taken over by the various Army field units garrisoned at CFB Calgary. The remaining property was sold to the ATCO Company, the City of Calgary and Mount Royal College. The main campus of Mount Royal University now occupies a section of the old aerodrome while the old hangars are occupied by various businesses.

As well as the primary operational field at Lincoln Park, a satellite or "relief" field existed at Shepard, just to the southeast of the city. The auxiliary training facilities at Shepard were used for air training using North American Harvard and Fleet Fort aircraft.

Aerodrome information 
The airfield was one of the few double-sided aerodromes built for wartime training with six parallel runways formed in a triangle rather than the typical three runways formed in a triangle.

Six runways were listed as follows:

The last vestiges of runways disappeared in 2001 when an industrial park was built and the last runway (north-south) was removed. The north–south runway was used as a dragstrip from the 1960s to 1983 under the name Calgary International Raceway.

Relief landing field - Airdrie 
The primary relief landing field (R1) for No.3 SFTS was located near the community of Airdrie, Alberta. The aerodrome was listed with three runways as follows:

A survey of google maps on 12 Jun 2018 shows a clear outline of the former relief airfield.  The BCATP runways are all now abandoned and a new longer runway has been installed through the middle of the triangle. The site now operates as the Airdrie Airport.

Relief landing field - Inverlake 
The secondary relief landing field (R2) for No.3 SFTS was located near the community of Inverlake, Alberta. The aerodrome was listed as a turf, triangular all way field with three runways as follows:

No. 37 Service Flying Training School
No. 37 Service Flying Training School (SFTS) was a Second World War Royal Air Force (RAF) flying school located at McCall Field, which is now Calgary International Airport in northeast Calgary. The school opened on October 22, 1941. Like all RAF schools in Canada during this time, No. 37 SFTS was subject to RCAF administrative and operational control and formally became part of the BCATP in 1942. Pilots in training flew Airspeed Oxfords, Avro Ansons and Cessna Cranes. The school closed on March 10, 1944. An original BCATP building is used by the Calgary Aerospace Museum.

Aerodrome information 
The airfield was one of the few double-sided aerodromes built for wartime training with six parallel runways formed in a triangle rather than the typical three runways formed in a triangle.

Six runways were listed as follows:

No. 2 Wireless School
No. 2 Wireless School was a BCATP radio operator school. It opened on September 16, 1940, and was located at the old Alberta Provincial Institute of Technology and Art, which is now the Southern Alberta Institute of Technology (SAIT). As one of the largest wireless training schools, it trained thousands of radio operators.

Flying squadron - Shepard 
The flying squadron of No.2 WS operated from an aerodrome located near the community of Shepard, Alberta. The airborne portion of wireless operator training was conducted in de Havilland Tiger Moths, Fleet Forts and North American Harvards. The aerodrome was listed with three runways as follows:

No. 4 Training Command Headquarters
Calgary was the location of No. 4 Training Command Headquarters from October 1941 to November 1944 after having moved from Regina, Saskatchewan. No. 4 Training Command Headquarters was responsible for BCATP operations in Alberta, British Columbia, and much of Saskatchewan.

References

Calgary
Military installations closed in the 1960s
Calgary
Organizations based in Calgary